The 2009 Team Speedway Junior European Championship will be the 2nd UEM Team Speedway Junior European Championship season. The Final will be held on August 23, 2009 in Holsted, Denmark. The championship was won by Poland (40 points), who they beat defending champion Sweden (38 points), host team Denmark (26 points) and Czech Republic (15 points).

Results 

In the Final will be the defending Champions Sweden, host team Denmark (3rd place in 2008 Final) and Poland (4th place). A last finalist will be determined in one Semi-Final. In Bockhorn, Germany on 18 July will be Ukraine, Czech Republic, Russia and host team Germany (2nd place). The Russian team withdrew and was replaced by Finland.

Heat details

Semi-final 
 18 July 2009 (20:00 UTC+2)
  Moorwinkelsdamm, Bockhorn, Lower Saxony (Speedwaystadion Moorwinkelsdamm - Length: 360 m)
 Referee and Jury President:  Krister Gardell
 Qualify: 1 to the Final

The Final 
 23 August 2009 (14:30 UTC+2)
  Holsted, Holsted Speedway Center (Length: 300 m)
 Referee:  M. Bates
 Jury President:  S. Lyatosinskyy

See also 
 2009 Team Speedway Junior World Championship
 2009 Individual Speedway Junior European Championship

References 

2009
European Team Junior